Maple Grove is an underwater ghost town in the Canadian province of Ontario. It is one of Ontario's Lost Villages, which were permanently flooded by the creation of the St. Lawrence Seaway in 1958.

Families and businesses in Maple Grove were moved by Ontario Hydro to the new town of Long Sault before the seaway construction commenced. On August 10, 1954, prime minister Louis St. Laurent, premier Leslie Frost and various U.S. officials turned the first shovelful of earth in Maple Grove. Jeremiah French came from Vermont and arrived at Maple Grove in 1784. He started out with nothing more than a tiny settlers' cottage which over time expanded into a huge flour and saw mills operation.

References

External links
Ghosttownpix.com - Maple Grove

The Lost Villages
1958 disestablishments in Ontario
Populated places disestablished in 1958